Events from the year 1704 in Sweden

Incumbents
 Monarch – Charles XII

Events

 29 February – This date was intended to be skipped in the calendar, but was not.  See February 30#Swedish calendar.
 14 May – Russian victory in the Second Battle on Peipus.
 15 June – The last execution for witchcraft in Sweden: Anna Eriksdotter is decapitated. 
 16 June – Battle of Wesenberg (1704)
 25 July – Battle of Jakobstadt
 July 12 – Great Northern War – Charles XII of Sweden forces the election of his ally Stanisław Leszczyński as King of Poland in place of Augustus II the Strong.
 9 August – Battle of Poznań (1704)
 10 August – Battle of Narva (1704)
 The enslavement of Lovisa von Burghausen.
 28 October – Battle of Poniec

Births

 1 November - Erland Broman, royal favorite   (died 1757)

Deaths

 15 June - Anna Eriksdotter, last person executed for witchcraft   (born 1624)

References

External links

 
Years of the 18th century in Sweden
Sweden